The Parras characodon (Characodon garmani) is a species of goodeid fish once endemic to Coahuila, Mexico. Its natural habitats were destroyed between 1900 and 1953, and no records have been made in the last century; it is considered extinct, although the validity of this taxon and where the actual type locality is are subject to some doubt. The specific name honours the American herpetologist and ichthyologist Samuel Garman (1843-1927).

References

Characodon
Fish of North America becoming extinct since 1500
Freshwater fish of Mexico
Endemic fish of Mexico
Natural history of Coahuila
Fish described in 1898
Taxa named by David Starr Jordan 
Taxonomy articles created by Polbot
Mexican Plateau